WDJZ (1590 kHz) is a commercial AM radio station licensed to South Daytona, Florida, and serving the Daytona Beach metropolitan area.  It is owned by Glenn Cherry and it broadcasts a smooth jazz radio format.  

WDJZ is powered at 1,000 watts by day, 47 watts at night, using a non-directional antenna.  The transmitter is on Dr. Martin Luther King Jr. Boulevard in Daytona Beach.  Programming is also heard on 220-watt FM translator W264DP at 100.7 MHz in Daytona Beach.

History
The station signed on the air in 1957 under the call sign WDAT.  It was a country-western station. Its call letters changed to WELE in 1959, and its format changed to an R&B music format in 1963 before going back to country by 1967. In 1981, the station took on new call letters WZIP and became an oldies station before returning to country in 1986.

In 1988, a group of investors who were graduates of the historically black Morehouse College bought WZIP.  The call letters changed to WPUL and format changed to urban contemporary.

Until 2022, WPUL broadcast progressive talk radio shows including The Thom Hartmann Program and The Stephanie Miller Show as well as various African-American-oriented shows including Keepin' It Real with Al Sharpton and locally produced shows.

The station was silent beginning on February 17, 2014, as station owners sought a new broadcast tower site.

On September 16, 2022, the station changed its call sign to WDJZ, which stands for Daytona Jazz.

References

External links

DJZ
Radio stations established in 1957
1957 establishments in Florida